Gorenje Jelenje (in older sources also Gorenje Jeline) is a settlement northwest of Dole in the Municipality of Litija in central Slovenia. The area is part of the traditional region of Lower Carniola. It is now included with the rest of the municipality in the Central Sava Statistical Region; until January 2014 the municipality was part of the Central Slovenia Statistical Region.

The local church is dedicated to Saints John and Paul and belongs to the Parish of Dole pri Litiji. It is a simple Baroque church, dating to the 18th century.

References

External links
Gorenje Jelenje on Geopedia

Populated places in the Municipality of Litija